Tito Vicente (Vicente O. Rivera), 1959 born in Ponce, Puerto Rico, is a pianist, keyboardist, and a one man band.

Early years
In 1972, at the age of 12, he started his career as a musician, playing the guitar with Los Romanos (The Romans), from Ponce. In 1974, Vicente alongside the group, participated in the Festival Cultural Puertorriqueño, (Cultural Puerto Rican Festival), in Boston, Massachusetts. As a teenager, he also played with several musical groups such as: Gente, (People) and  El grupo Semillas, (The Seeds group).

High school years
In 1978, while he was a senior at Ponce High School he also studied in Escuela Libre de Música Juan Morel Campos, where besides playing the piano and the guitar, he started taking saxophone and trumpet lessons.  His knowledge of executing different musical instruments, led him to play the guitar, the bass, and the typical string instrument of Puerto Rico, the cuatro, for the Ponce High vocal group.

Professional career
In order to attain more experience, as a many sided musician, Vicente moved to Boston, Massachusetts.  He started taking advanced piano lessons with Anne Lamoure, and his apprenticeship was in such a fast pace, that in a short time, Tito became Lamoure's assistant. Later & also in Boston, he was the pianist, of the salsa orquestra, Sabor Latino, (Latin Flavor), where Domingo Quiñones was the lead singer. Subsequently, he moved to Puerto Rico, and this time established his residence in San Juan.

Later years
As Tito Vicente, learned how to play various musical instruments, that led him, through modern technology, to become a one man band.  He kept on taking advanced music lessons at the Conservatorio de Música Puertorriqueña, (Puerto Rican Conservatory of Music). Simultaneously, he was working with Elin Ortiz, as a music technician, playing background music for several of his television variety shows. His skills as a musician who plays several instruments during a solo performance, has led him to become the whole band and musical director of various singers in the island such as: Chucho Avellanet, Carmen Delia Dipini, Ruth Fernández, Lalo Rodríguez, Ismael Miranda, and mostly the multi-talented performer Carmen Nydia Velázquez, among many others.  Vicente's been on tour in Madrid, Asturias, Milan  Turín, Florida, Massachusetts, California, Connecticut, and Latin America.

As time goes by, day by day, Tito Vicente is well acknowledged for his achievements as a musician, who alone undertakes and is responsible for several tasks in the solo performance of different musical instruments, including the bass pedals, executed with his left foot.

See also
Chucho Avellanet
Ismael Miranda

External links
https://web.archive.org/web/20080409122001/http://downloads.walmart.com/swap/
http://www.prtc.net/~rasnov/duos-trios.htm

1959 births
Living people
American keyboardists
Puerto Rican pianists
Puerto Rican multi-instrumentalists
Musicians from Ponce
21st-century pianists